Iris juncea (commonly called the rush iris) is a smooth-bulbed bulbous iris species. The name is derived from 'juncea' from the Greek word meaning 'rush-like'.

It was first described by Jean Louis Marie Poiret in 1871. It was then illustrated in Curtis's Botanical Magazine in 1898.

Its flowers are light yellow and fragrant. Normally 2 per stem in summer. It flowers between June and July.

It grows to a height of between 1 and 2 feet. 
The 3mm wide leaves appear in the autumn and then fade before flowering.

The bulb is reddish-brown in colour.

It can be found in (Algeria and Tunisia) in North Africa, Southern Spain and Sicily.

Other varieties known include;
 iris juncea var. merimieri (Lynch) Sulphur yellow flowers
 iris juncea var. numidica (Anon) lemon-yellow flowers  (from Africa)
 iris juncea var. pallida (Lynch) large soft yellow flowers

References

External link

juncea
Garden plants
Flora of Spain
Flora of Europe
Flora of Africa